Hendrik Jan "Henk" Hofstra (28 September 1904 – 16 February 1999) was a Dutch politician of the Labour Party (PvdA).

Decorations

References

External links

Official
  H.J. (Henk) Hofstra Parlement & Politiek
 

 

 

1904 births
1999 deaths
Commanders of the Order of the Netherlands Lion
Commanders of the Order of Orange-Nassau
Dutch corporate directors
Dutch nonprofit directors
Dutch legal scholars
Dutch financial analysts
Dutch financial writers
Dutch jurists
Evangelical Lutheran Church Christians from the Netherlands
Academic staff of Leiden University
Ministers of Finance of the Netherlands
Members of the House of Representatives (Netherlands)
Scholars of tax law
Social Democratic Workers' Party (Netherlands) politicians
Labour Party (Netherlands) politicians
Remonstrants
University of Amsterdam alumni
Writers from Amsterdam
People from Wassenaar
20th-century Dutch civil servants
20th-century Dutch economists
20th-century Dutch educators
20th-century Dutch male writers
20th-century Dutch politicians